Shariz Ahmad (born 21 April 2003) is a Dutch cricketer. He has played for the Netherlands national cricket team since 2022. He is a right-arm leg spin bowler.

Personal life
Ahmad was born on 21 April 2003, the younger brother of fellow Netherlands international Musa Ahmed. Their father Nadeem Ahmad played top-level club cricket in the Netherlands after immigrating from Lahore, Pakistan. He and his sons played for Groen en Wit CC in Amsterdam.

Junior career
In October 2020, Ahmad was named in the Dutch academy squad, following his performances at the under-18 level. The following September, he was part of the Dutch squad for the under-19 qualification matches in the Europe group for the 2022 ICC Under-19 Cricket World Cup. He was also the leading wicket-taker for the Netherlands in the group.

International career
In February 2022, Ahmad earned his maiden senior international call-up, after being named in the Dutch limited overs squads for their tour of New Zealand. In May 2022, he was named in the Dutch One Day International (ODI) squad for their series against the West Indies. He made his ODI debut on 2 June 2022, against the West Indies.

In July 2022, he was named in the Netherlands' Twenty20 International (T20I) squad for the 2022 ICC Men's T20 World Cup Global Qualifier B tournament in Zimbabwe. He made his T20I debut on 11 July 2022, for the Netherlands against Papua New Guinea. He was the Netherlands' best bowler in the 1st T20I against New Zealand, taking 2/15.

References

External links
 

2003 births
Living people
Dutch cricketers
Netherlands Twenty20 International cricketers
Netherlands One Day International cricketers
Place of birth missing (living people)
21st-century Dutch people
Dutch people of Pakistani descent